"Anything But Lonely" is a 1989 single by Sarah Brightman. The song is from the musical Aspects of Love. The music was written by Andrew Lloyd Webber and the lyrics by Don Black and Charles Hart. The single peaked at #79 in the UK charts.

Track listing

7 inch vinyl
 "Anything But Lonely"
 "Half a Moment"

12 inch vinyl & CD single
 "Anything But Lonely
 "Half a Moment"
 "What Makes Me Love Him?"
 "English Girls"

1989 singles
Songs from musicals
Songs with music by Andrew Lloyd Webber
Songs with lyrics by Don Black (lyricist)
Sarah Brightman songs
1989 songs
Polydor Records singles
Songs with lyrics by Charles Hart (lyricist)